The Rejang alphabet, is an abugida of the Brahmic family, and is related to other scripts of the region, like Batak, Lontara, and others. Rejang is a member of the closely related group of  Ulu scripts that include the script variants of South Sumatra, Bengkulu, Lembak, Lintang, Lebong, and Serawai. Other scripts that are closely related, and sometimes included in the Surat Ulu group, are South Sumatra, Kerinci and Lampung. The script was in use prior to the introduction of Islam to the Rejang area; the earliest attested document appears to date from the mid-18th century CE. The Rejang script is sometimes also known as the KaGaNga script following the first three letters of the alphabet. The term KaGaNga was never used by the users of the script community, but it was coined by the British anthropologist Mervyn A. Jaspan (1926–1975) in his book Folk literature of South Sumatra. Redjang Ka-Ga-Nga texts. Canberra, The Australian National University 1964.

The script was used to write texts in Malay and Rejang, which is now spoken by about 200,000 people living in Indonesia on the island of Sumatra in the southwest highlands, north Bengkulu Province, around Arga Makmur, Muaraaman, Curup, and Kepahiang, and also in the Rawas area of South Sumatra Province, near Muara Kulam. There are five major dialects of Rejang: Lebong, Musi, Kebanagung, Pesisir (all in Bengkulu Province), and Rawas (in South Sumatra Province). Most of its users live in fairly remote rural areas, of whom slightly less than half are literate.

The traditional Rejang corpus consists chiefly of ritual texts, medical incantations, and poetry.

Letters
Letters of the script can be found in the inscription below:

Letters with IPA
Exception for the virama, in which its base letter is ka.

See also
 Rencong script

References

External links
 https://www.unicode.org/L2/L2021/21116-surat-ulu.pdf

Brahmic scripts
Indonesian scripts